"Softly to Fallen" is the title of a song and included as the A-side of a 7" single by the British band Palm Springs.

"Softly to Fallen" was the third single released by Palm Springs and attracted praise from German Rolling Stone magazine, where at the end of the year, the editor positioned it at number two in his “Best 45s of 2006” list.

2006 singles
Palm Springs (band) songs
2006 songs